The 2003 Frankfurt Galaxy season was the 11th season for the franchise in the NFL Europe League (NFLEL). The team was led by head coach Doug Graber in his third year, and played its home games at Waldstadion in Frankfurt, Germany. They finished the regular season in first place with a record of six wins and four losses. In World Bowl XI, Frankfurt defeated the Rhein Fire 35–16. The victory marked the franchise's third World Bowl championship.

Offseason

Free agent draft

Personnel

Staff

Roster

Standings

Game summaries

World Bowl XI

References

Frankfurt
Frankfurt Galaxy seasons